The Australian Journal of Physics was a peer-reviewed scientific journal published by the Commonwealth Scientific and Industrial Research Organisation in Australia. It was a journal for the publication of reviews covering all branches of physics. The journal surveyed the development of selected topics within the wider context of physics.

The journal published its last issue in April 2001 and is no longer receiving papers. The journal's electronic archive, covering the years 1953–2001, is available for free full text access.

One of the most highly cited papers published in the journal is
 
in which he first presented the projection-slice theorem widely used in medical imaging.

See also
List of physics journals

External links 

Physics journals
Defunct journals
Publications established in 1948
Publications disestablished in 2001
CSIRO Publishing academic journals
Bimonthly journals